Rebuilt by Humans is the second album by British singer-songwriter Newton Faulkner. It was released on 28 September 2009. "If This Is It" was released as the first single from the album, with "Over and Out" being the second single and "Let's Get Together" being the third single.

Title 

Regarding the album's title, Faulkner stated:

It's  an accident I had, where I basically broke my wrist on Boxing Day, five days before I was meant to start recording the second album. So it was like a really proper close call and they used a rather large metal plate, in fact they were using the x-ray as part of at the artwork, when you take the CD out of the case it's going to be behind that.

Lyrics 

The album's lyrics explore the management of relationships, friendships and daily life, with most if its songs analysing the connections people form with each other, both positive and negative. Other recurring themes include the appreciation of nature and the great outdoors, the desire to better oneself, and peace between human beings.

Track listing

Certifications

References

2009 albums
Newton Faulkner albums